Jordon Poole (born 2 April 1997) is an English rugby union hooker who plays for Coventry in the RFU Championship.  He previously played for Exeter Chiefs in Premiership Rugby and Leeds Tykes in the RFU Championship. His playing position is Hooker.

References

External links
Exeter Chiefs Profile
ESPN Profile
Ultimate Rugby Profile

1997 births
Living people
English rugby union players
Exeter Chiefs players
Rugby union players from Leeds
Rugby union hookers
Leeds Tykes players
Coventry R.F.C. players